There are at least three schools named Rocky Mountain Middle School in three US cities:

Idaho Falls, Idaho
Heber City, Utah
Deaver, Wyoming